A Swedish Love Story (lit. 'A Love Story') is a 1970 Swedish romantic drama directed by Roy Andersson, starring Ann-Sofie Kylin and Rolf Sohlman as two teenagers falling in love. Inspired by the Czechoslovak New Wave, the film was Andersson's feature film debut and was successful in Sweden and abroad.

Cast

 Ann-Sofie Kylin as Annika
 Rolf Sohlman as Pär
 Anita Lindblom as Eva
 Bertil Norström as John Hellberg
 Lennart Tellfelt as Lasse
 Margreth Weivers as Elsa
 Arne Andersson as Arne
 Maud Backéus as Gunhild
 Verner Edberg as Verner
 Elsie Holm as Guest at Crayfish Party
 Tommy Nilsson - Roger
 Gunnar Ossiander as Pär's Grandfather
 Gunvor Ternéus as Guest at Crayfish Party
 Lennart Tollén as Lennart
 Björn Andrésen as Pär's Buddy

Production and reception
Roy Andersson had just graduated from film school, having made two promising short films and a 48 minutes examination film, when he was given the opportunity to make A Swedish Love Story. The film was shot between 16 June and 26 August 1969. The Time Out Film Guide 2009 says the film is "strangely touching and wonderfully strange."

Awards
It was entered into the 20th Berlin International Film Festival. The film was also selected as the Swedish entry for the Best Foreign Language Film at the 43rd Academy Awards, but was not accepted as a nominee. At the 7th Guldbagge Awards the film won the award for Best Film.

See also
 List of submissions to the 43rd Academy Awards for Best Foreign Language Film
 List of Swedish submissions for the Academy Award for Best Foreign Language Film

References

External links

Trailer (from Solaris Distribution)

Films directed by Roy Andersson
Films scored by Björn Isfält
Swedish teen drama films
Juvenile sexuality in films
1970s Swedish-language films
1970 films
1970s teen drama films
1970 drama films
1970 directorial debut films
1970s Swedish films